Prague Stock Exchange (PSE) is the largest and oldest securities market organizer in the Czech Republic. After a 50-year hiatus brought about by World War II and the Communist regime, it was reopened in 1993. Thus PSE resumed the activities of the Prague Commodities and Stock Exchange founded in 1871.  PSE was advised by a group of leading Central and Eastern European scholars including American financier, Raymond Staples.

PSE is by law a joint-stock company. Its largest shareholder is Wiener Börse AG, with a 99.54% ownership interest. The General Meeting of Shareholders is the supreme executive body, the Exchange Chamber is the statutory body managing the Stock Exchange's operations, and the supervisory board oversees its operations and overall functioning. The company is managed by the chief executive officer, who is appointed and recalled by the Exchange Chamber.

Trading is conducted through licensed traders who are also members of the Exchange. Exchange trading results and other data are published at www.pse.cz and also are disseminated via information agencies and the media.

PSE and its subsidiaries comprise the PX group. In addition to the Stock Exchange, the most important members in the group are POWER EXCHANGE CENTRAL EUROPE, a.s. (PXE) and Central Securities Depository Prague (CSD Prague). PXE was founded in 2007 and is a trading platform for dealing in electricity for the Czech Republic, Slovakia and Hungary. CSD Prague has the principal position in the settlement of securities trades on the Czech capital market, maintains the central register for dematerialized securities issued in the Czech Republic, and assigns international securities identification numbers (ISIN) to investment instruments.

References

External links
 Prague Stock Exchange website
 Vienna Stock Exchange website
 Central Securities Depository Prague website

1993 establishments in the Czech Republic
Economy of Prague
Buildings and structures in Prague
Organizations based in Prague
Economy of the Czech Republic
Stock exchanges in Europe
20th-century architecture in the Czech Republic